Panorama is the oldest German current affairs television magazine, first aired on 4 June 1961. Anja Reschke has been moderator since 2001. It became popular, with often controversial topics leading to broader discussions and legal consequences.

History 

Panorama was initiated in 1961 by Rüdiger Proske, then director of the department of current events of Norddeutscher Rundfunk (NDR). It was designed following the model of the successful Panorama that the BBC had aired from 1953. It was the first political television magazine in Germany, aired by ARD.

In 2008, a new format began, Panorama – Die Reporter. Its reports, including about the textile company KiK and the 2017 G20 Hamburg summit, received several awards.

Controversies 
Critical reports often caused legal persecution. In 1962, police arrested a Panorama team in Geldern for filming for a report about a teacher who had been an SS guard under the Nazi regime. In fall the same year, members of the federal government criticised Panorama for "torpedoing" its measures ("Maßnahmen der Bundesregierung zu torpedieren").

In 1974, when Peter Merseburger ran the magazine, a report about an abortion by Alice Schwarzer, at the time a criminal act, was cancelled by authorities (Intendantenkonferenz) last minute. Merseburger did not moderate the broadcast in protest, and a speaker read his texts.

After a series of reports in 1978 about the Brokdorf Nuclear Power Plant, the NDR  was terminated. In 1988, a lawyer of Oskar Lafontaine prevented a critical report minutes before the broadcast began.

In 2003, the former chancellor Helmut Kohl evaded a question from a Panorama reporter, saying that Panorama had "nothing to do with journalism" ("Ich habe überhaupt nicht die Absicht mit Ihnen 'n Interview (zu machen […] Sie sind doch von „Panorama“ [...] Wissen's doch, was das heißt. Sie haben doch mit Journalismus nix zu tun.“).

Awards 
In 2018, authors of Panorama received the Grimme-Preis for exceptional journalism in the category "Information und Kultur" for a report of the 2017 G20 Hamburg summit. In March 2020, the Panorama authors  and Jonas Schreijäg received the Grimme-Preis for their documentary SeaWatch3.

Moderators 

  (1961–1963)
 Rolf Menzel (1961–1963)
 Joachim Besser (1961–1963)
 Rüdiger Proske (1961–1963)
  (1963)
  (1963)
  (1963)
 Walter Menningen (1963)
 Guido Schütte (1963)
 Dietrich Koch (1963–1964)
 Eugen Kogon (1964)
 Joachim Fest (1965–1966)
 Peter Merseburger (1967–1975)
  (1975–1976)
 Ulrich Happel (1977)
  (1978–1981)
  (1981–1987)
  (1987–1996)
 Patricia Schlesinger (1997–2001)
 Anja Reschke (from 2001)

Literature 
 Anja Reschke: Die Unbequemen. Wie Panorama die Republik verändert hat. Redline-Verlag, Munich 2011, .

References

Further reading

External links 
 
 
 Das Panorama-Archiv (episodes from 50 years) NDR

Current affairs shows
Norddeutscher Rundfunk
Das Erste original programming
1961 German television series debuts
German television news shows